The 2019 UCLA Bruins baseball team represents the University of California, Los Angeles in the 2019 NCAA Division I baseball season as a member of the Pac-12 Conference. The team is coached by John Savage and plays their home games at Jackie Robinson Stadium.

UCLA finished the regular season with a 47–8 overall record (24–5 in conference). They were the #1 ranked team for much of the year, and were awarded the #1 overall seed in the 2019 NCAA Division I baseball tournament.

Previous season

The Bruins finished 38–21 overall, and 19–11 in the conference. During the season, the Bruins were invited and participated in the Dodger Stadium Classic in Los Angeles, California. UCLA was defeated by Vanderbilt and USC. In the postseason, the Bruins were invited and participated in the 2018 NCAA Division I baseball tournament, where they lost to Minnesota twice in the Corvallis Regional in Corvallis, Oregon.

MLB draft selections

The Bruins had four individuals selected in the 2018 MLB draft.

Roster

Schedule

Rankings

2019 MLB draft

The Bruins had 13 players selected in the draft, tying a program record, and tying Vanderbilt for most in the 2019 draft.

References

UCLA
UCLA Bruins baseball seasons
UCLA Bruins baseball
UCLA
Pac-12 Conference baseball champion seasons